The New York Film Festival (NYFF) is a film festival held every fall in New York City, presented by Film at Lincoln Center (FLC). Founded in 1963 by Richard Roud and Amos Vogel with the support of Lincoln Center president William Schuman, it is one of the longest-running and most prestigious film festivals in the United States. The non-competitive festival is centered on a "Main Slate" of typically 20–30 feature films, with additional sections for experimental cinema and new restorations.

As of 2020, Eugene Hernandez is the Director of NYFF and Dennis Lim is the Director of Programming for NYFF. Kent Jones was the festival director from 2013 to 2019.

Sections 
As of 2020, the festival program is divided into the following sections:

Main Slate 
The Main Slate is the Festival’s primary section, a program typically featuring 25-30 feature-length films, intending to reflect the current state of cinema. The program is a mix of major international art house films from the festival circuit, new discoveries, and studio releases targeting awards season. The studio films are often selected as Opening Night, Centerpiece, and Closing Night presentations.

Currents 
Currents complements the Main Slate, tracing a more complete picture of contemporary cinema with an emphasis on new and innovative forms and voices.

Spotlight 
Spotlight is showcase of the season’s most anticipated and significant films.

Revivals 
The Revivals section showcases important works from renowned filmmakers that have been digitally remastered, restored, and preserved with the assistance of generous partners.

Talks 
Talks features in-depth conversations with filmmakers, critics, curators, and more.

History

Founding the Festival and Richard Roud

The NYFF's first programmer, Richard Roud, was recruited by Lincoln Center President William Schuman in 1962. Boston-born Roud was 33 years old at the time and based in London where he worked as a film critic for The Guardian and programmed the London Film Festival. Though Roud maintained his home base in London, he recruited Amos Vogel of the legendary Cinema 16 film club as his New York-based co-programmer. The first edition of the festival opened on September 10, 1963 with Luis Buñuel's The Exterminating Angel. In 1966, Roud and Vogel formed the festival's first selection committee, consisting of Arthur Knight and Andrew Sarris; Susan Sontag was added the next year. Vogel resigned from his position as Festival Director in 1968. Though Roud was previously designated Program Director, he presided over the festival from 1969 to 1987.

Roud's 25 years at the festival were characterized by a focus on the European art cinema of the postwar years and the rise of auteurism.

The Richard Peña era

Richard Peña, then 34, took over as lead programmer in 1988. The Queens native was already an accomplished film historian, academic, and programmer. Prior to his work with NYFF, he worked at the Film Center of the School of the Art Institute of Chicago. Peña came to NYFF as a seasoned festival-goer who held Roud in high esteem. During his stint as programmer (which also listed 25 years), Peña honored the festival's traditions and unique character - retaining the selection committee process, the non-competitive format, the post-screening director Q&As, and the festival's strict selectivity - while also working to expand NYFF's somewhat Eurocentric focus. Filmmakers like Hou Hsiao-hsien, Manoel de Oliveira, Leos Carax, Raúl Ruiz, and Krzystof Kieslowski were introduced to NYFF audiences during the Roud era, and became regulars under Peña. After 25 years as Program Director and head of the NYFF selection committee, Peña led his final year at NYFF in 2012, during the festival's 50th presentation.

NYFF today

After Richard Peña's departure, Robert Koehler briefly took over year-round programming duties, while Kent Jones, who left The Film Society of Lincoln Center in 2009 to serve as Executive Director of the World Cinema Foundation, returned to lead NYFF. Jones began his programming career at Film Forum and the Rotterdam Film Festival, before joining The Film Society of Lincoln Center in 1998 as Associate Director of Programming and a member of the NYFF programming committee.

See also
 List of films shown at the New York Film Festival
 New York International Children's Film Festival

References

External links 
New York Film Festival Official website (2016)
Film Society of Lincoln Center Presenting organization website

 
1963 establishments in New York City
Experimental film festivals
Film festivals established in 1963
Film festivals in New York City
Lincoln Center